Richard Robert Montgomerie (born 3 July 1971, Rugby, Warwickshire) is a former English cricketer who played first-class cricket for Sussex, Northamptonshire and Oxford University.

Cricket career
A right-handed opener, Montgomerie made his first-class debut in 1991 for Northamptonshire. He graduated from Oxford University, where he was a Blue, in 1994 and had by then cemented his spot in the side as an opening batsman. After 8 years at Northants, he moved to Sussex for the 1999 season. He became a member of the Sussex County Championship winning side in 2003 and later winning the C&G-Championship double in 2006.

At Sussex he formed an opening partnership with Murray Goodwin and together they are in the record books with an unbeaten partnership of 372 against Nottinghamshire at Trent Bridge in 2001.

In 2007 Sussex won their third championship in five years, Montgomerie scoring 1,000 runs at 40.00 and taking 27 catches. At the end of the season he retired from the game to go into full-time teaching.

One of the most reliable and consistent county openers of his era, in 251 first class matches he scored 14,337 runs at an average of 35.84.  He scored 29 first class centuries with a highest score of 196.

In the latter part of his career he often fielded at silly point and short leg, taking many catches for Mushtaq Ahmed.

Teacher
Montgomerie was educated at Rugby School and Worcester College, Oxford. He is currently a chemistry teacher at Eton College where he was a housemaster at Jourdelay's for 1 year, and is currently master in charge of the cricket XI.

References

External links
 

1971 births
Living people
Sportspeople from Rugby, Warwickshire
Sussex cricketers
Northamptonshire cricketers
Oxford University cricketers
Oxford and Cambridge Universities cricketers
People educated at Rugby School
Alumni of Worcester College, Oxford
Schoolteachers from Warwickshire
British Universities cricketers
Test and County Cricket Board XI cricketers
Teachers at Eton College